Pusta River may refer to:

 Pusta River (South Morava), a river in Serbia, tributary of South Morava
 , a river in Serbia, tributary of Vlasina
 Pusta (Crișul Negru), a river in Romania, tributary of Crișul Negru

See also 

 Pusta Reka (disambiguation)